Nebraska Highway 56 is a highway in central Nebraska. The western terminus is near Greeley at U.S. Highway 281, and the eastern terminus is at Nebraska Highway 39 just west of St. Edward.

Route description
Nebraska Highway 56 begins less than a mile south of Greeley at U.S. 281.  It runs east through farmland to Cedar Rapids, where it meets Nebraska Highway 52.  The two highway run concurrent east of Cedar Rapids for about a mile, then separate.  After going northeast briefly, the highway continues east towards St. Edward, passing Nebraska Highway 14 and ending about a mile west of St. Edward at Highway 39.

Major intersections

References

External links

Nebraska Roads: NE 41-60

056
Transportation in Greeley County, Nebraska
Transportation in Boone County, Nebraska